The Southern League Hall of Fame is an American baseball hall of fame which honors players, managers, coaches, umpires, owners, executives, and media personnel of the Southern League of Minor League Baseball for their accomplishments and/or contributions to the league and its teams. The Hall of Fame inducted its first class in 2014. Through the elections for 2020, a total of 45 people have been inducted.

In July 2013, the Southern League Board of Directors met to determine the first members of the league's Hall of Fame, which was to be celebrated in 2014 in conjunction with the league's 50th anniversary. Former league presidents Billy Hitchcock, Jim Bragan, and Don Mincher were unanimously selected. They and ten others, one chosen by each of the league's ten teams, were recognized as the inaugural Hall of Fame class at the 2014 Southern League All-Star Game in Chattanooga.

For the 2015 class, each team nominated up to three individuals for consideration. A 31-person voting committee of Southern League and Minor League Baseball personnel then narrowed the list to just ten inductees, selecting one from each organization. A tie vote for the Birmingham Barons' nominees resulted in the election of both Rollie Fingers and Frank Thomas. A Special Consideration Ballot was introduced that year, which allows teams to nominate anyone who has made significant contributions to teams from the league's predecessors: the original Southern League (1885–1899) and Southern Association (1901–1961). Harmon Killebrew became the first inductee to be elected via the Special Consideration Ballot in 2015. A similar format was assumed in 2016, wherein each team submitted nominations but only the top three were chosen for induction by a 30-member voting committee. The size of the voting panel has since fluctuated: 20 members in 2017,  23 in 2018, and 34 in 2019. For 2020, the Hall of Fame committee endorsed a special proposal by league president Lori Webb to induct Frances Crockett Ringley, baseball's first female general manager, in addition to three regular inductees and a Special Consideration Ballot Hall of Famer.

Sixteen Southern League Hall of Famers have also been inducted in the National Baseball Hall of Fame and Museum. These are Sparky Anderson, Rollie Fingers, Tom Glavine, Roy Halladay, Trevor Hoffman, Reggie Jackson, Randy Johnson, Chipper Jones, Harmon Killebrew, Tony La Russa, Edgar Martínez, Willie Mays, Ryne Sandberg, Frank Thomas, Alan Trammell, and Larry Walker.

Table key

Inductees

Notes

References

External links
Official website

Hall
Minor league baseball museums and halls of fame
Minor league baseball trophies and awards
Awards established in 2013
Halls of fame in Georgia (U.S. state)